Alice Zeniter (born 1986) is a French novelist, translator, scriptwriter, dramatist and director.

She has won a Prix Renaudot young adult award for her third novel, Juste avant l'Oubli, and a Prix Goncourt young adult for her fourth novel, L'Art de Perdre.

Zeniter published her first novel, Deux moins un égal zéro, at the age of 16. Her second novel, Jusque dans nos bras, was published in 2010 and translated in English as Take This Man.

Her latest novel, L'Art de Perdre, won multiple prizes and awards. It was published in English in 2021 as The Art of Losing, for which she won the International Dublin Literary Award along with its translator Frank Wynne.

Early life
Zeniter was born in Clamart, to an Algerian father and a French mother. She was raised in Champfleur and lived there until she was 17. She continued her studies in Alençon. From 2006 until 2011 she was a student at École Normale Supérieure in Paris.

Works

Works in English 
Take this man, New York: Europa, 2012. , 
The Art of Losing, (translated by Frank Wynne) London: Picador (imprint) , 2021; New York: Farrar, Straus and Giroux, 2021 .

Novels
 Deux moins un égal zéro, Nantes, France, Éditions du Petit Véhicule, coll. « Plaine Page », 2003, 112 p.
 Jusque dans nos bras, Paris, Albin Michel, 2010, 236 p.
 Prix littéraire de la Porte Dorée 2010
 Prix littéraire Laurence Trân 2011
 Sombre Dimanche, Paris, éditions Albin Michel, 2013, 236 p.
 Prix de la Closerie des Lilas 2013
 Prix du Livre Inter 2013
 Prix des lecteurs de l'Express 2013
Juste avant l'Oubli, Editions Flammarion, 2015,   
 Prix Renaudot des lycéens 2015
L'Art de Perdre, Éditions Flammarion, 2017. , 
 Prix Goncourt des lycéens 2017
 Prix littéraire du Monde 2017
 Prix Landerneau des lecteurs 2017
 Prix des libraires de Nancy
 Prix Liste Goncourt : le choix polonais, Cracovie, 2017
 Prix Liste Goncourt : le choix de la Suisse 2017
 Finaliste Prix Goncourt 2017
Comme un empire dans un empire, Éditions Flammarion, 2020. ,

Theatre
 Spécimens humains avec monstres, 2011
Hansel et Gretel, Editions Acte Sud, 2018

Translation 

 I love Dick, Chris Kraus, Editions Flammarion, 2016

Filmography 

 Fever, 2014

References

Writers from Alençon
1986 births
21st-century French novelists
École Normale Supérieure alumni
Prix du Livre Inter winners
21st-century French women writers
Living people
Prix Renaudot des lycéens winners
People from Sarthe